Brian Kavanagh (born 1935) is an Australian author, editor, writer, producer, and director of films and documentaries. As a film editor, he is known for his collaborative works with Fred Schepisi and Murray Fahey. In 1986, he was honored with the Australia Film Institute Award for Best Achievement in Editing, for his work on Frog Dreaming. In 1997, he was awarded a lifetime membership of Australian Screen Editors.

Filmography

As director/producer 
 1971: A City's Child
 1980: Maybe This Time (as producer only)
 1983: Double Deal (also as writer)
 1986: Departure
 1996: Flynn (original director)

As editor 
 1970: The Naked Bunyip
 1973: Libido
 1976: The Devil's Playground
 1978: The Chant of Jimmie Blacksmith
 1978: Long Weekend
 1979: The Odd Angry Shot
 1985: Frog Dreaming
 1986: Going Sane
 1993: Frauds
 1993: Get Away, Get Away
 1994: Encounters
 1995: Sex Is a Four Letter Word
 1998: Dags
 2001: Cubbyhouse

Honors and awards 
 1986: Australia Film Institute Award for Best Achievement in Editing – Frog Dreaming
 1997: Australian Screen Editors – Lifetime Membership

Published works 
 Kavanagh, Brian (2005). Capable of Murder, Bewrite Books, 188 pages. 
 Kavanagh, Brian (2006). The Embroidered Corpse, Bewrite Books, 200 pages. 
 Kavanagh, Brian (2007). Bloody Ham, Bewrite Books, 180 pages. 
 Kavanagh, Brian (2010). A Canterbury Crime, Bewrite Books, 156 pages.

References

External links 
 
 

Australian film directors
Living people
1935 births